James F. "Jim" White Sr. (born May 13, 1935) was an American funeral director and politician.

From Farmington, Minnesota, White graduated from Lakeville High School in 1953. He went to College of Saint Benedict and Saint John's University. White then received his bachelor's degree in mortuary science from University of Minnesota. White served in the Minnesota House of Representatives from 1975 to 1979 and was a Democrat.

References

1941 births
Living people
People from Farmington, Minnesota
College of Saint Benedict and Saint John's University alumni
University of Minnesota Medical School alumni
Businesspeople from Minnesota
Democratic Party members of the Minnesota House of Representatives